Denticollis linearis is a species of click beetle belonging to the family Elateridae subfamily Dendrometrinae.

This beetle is present in most of Europe, in the East Palearctic realm, the Nearctic realm, and the Near East.

Denticollis linearis is quite similar to a Cantharidae species, but it can be distinguished from a soldier beetle by the two basal angles very protruding on pronotum and the deep longitudinal rows of pits.

The pronotum varies from orange-red to brownish, the elytra from dark-brown to yellowish, while the head and femora are generally blackish, the tarsi and tibia are orange-yellow.

The larvae are omnivorous, feeding on many different plants and other species larvae.

References
 Mendel, H. & Clarke, R. E., 1996, Provisional Atlas of the click beetles of (Coleoptera: Elateroidea) of Britain and Ireland, Ipswich Borough Council Museums, Ipswich
 Speight, M. C. D., 1989, The Irish Elaterid and Buprestid fauna (Coleoptera: Elateridae and Buprestidae), Bulletin of the Irish Biogeographical Society, 12: 31-62

Subspecies
 Denticollis linearis var. mesomelas  (Linnaeus)
 Denticollis linearis var. variabilis (DeGeer)

External links
 Biolib
 Elateridae
 Habitas
 Fauna Europaea
 Elateridae.co.uk

Elateridae
Beetles of Europe
Beetles described in 1758
Taxa named by Carl Linnaeus